Fighting Bujutsu, known in Japan as , is an August 1997 3D fighting arcade game developed and published by Konami. It is Konami's second attempt in the 3D fighting game market, after their 1996 Lightning Legend: Daigo no Daibouken, and was released only in arcades.

Fighting Bujutsu was unveiled as one of the first games powered by the Konami Cobra System Hardware (the other being Racing Jam) in a 10-minute videotape shown at the 1997 ASI arcade show. At this point it had no working title, and was referred to only by the codename "PF 573". It was shown again at that year's JAMMA show, by which time it was named Fighting Wu-Shu. According to Next Generation, there was "some question of how (or if) to present [Fighting Wu-Shu] to the U.S. market." The game made its U.S. debut, now under the title Fighting Bujutsu, at the AMOA Expo in Atlanta in October 1997.

Gameplay
Much like Sega's Virtua Fighter 2, Fighting Bujutsu utilizes a control scheme consisting of a control stick and three buttons: Punch, Kick, and Guard. A Beginner Mode maps combo techniques to individual buttons.

 Reception 
In Japan, Game Machine listed Fighting Bujutsu on their November 15, 1997 issue as being the eighth most-successful dedicated arcade game of the month.

References

External links
 Fighting Bujutsu at Arcade-History''

1997 video games
Arcade video games
Arcade-only video games
3D fighting games
Konami games
Fighting games
Konami arcade games
Video games developed in Japan